Ponerorchis oblonga is a species of flowering plant in the family Orchidaceae, native to south-central China (north-west Yunnan).

Taxonomy
The species was first described in 1997 by Kai Yung Lang, as Neottianthe oblonga. A molecular phylogenetic study in 2014 found that species of Neottianthe, Amitostigma and Ponerorchis were mixed together in a single clade, making none of the three genera monophyletic as then circumscribed. Neottianthe and Amitostigma were subsumed into Ponerorchis, with this species becoming Ponerorchis oblonga.

References

oblonga
Orchids of Yunnan
Plants described in 1997